Love Is a Many Stupid Thing is a 2004 comedy film written, produced and directed by Wong Jing and starring Eric Tsang, Chapman To, Natalis Chan, Shawn Yue, Lam Chi-chung and Raymond Wong Ho-yin. The film is a parody of the 2002 hit film Infernal Affairs, which featured Tsang, To and Yue.

Plot
Inspector Nat (Natalis Chan) send three undercover cops Ray (Chapman To), Tom (Shawn Yue) and Chubbie (Lam Chi-chung) to infiltrate triad boss Sam (Eric Tsang). Sam also sent Watson (Raymond Wong Ho-yin) as a mole to the police force. During their mission, Ray, Tom and Chubbie fall for three beautiful policewoman Angel (Belinda Hamnett), Leila (Race Wong) and Sharon (Iris Wong).

Cast

References

External links
 
 Love is a Many Stupid Thing at Hong Kong Cinemagic
 

2004 films
2004 romantic comedy films
2000s crime comedy films
Hong Kong romantic comedy films
2000s Cantonese-language films
2000s parody films
Hong Kong slapstick comedy films
Triad films
Police detective films
Films directed by Wong Jing
Films set in Hong Kong
Films shot in Hong Kong
2000s Hong Kong films